Stewart Hills is a group of several small nunataks and snow hills rising above an otherwise featureless terrain, 50 nautical miles (90 km) northeast of Ford Massif, Thiel Mountains. Observed by the United States Antarctic Research Program (USARP) Horlick Mountains Traverse, 1958–59, and by Edward Thiel and Campbell Craddock in the course of an airlifted geophysical traverse, December 13, 1959. The name was proposed by Thiel and Craddock for Professor Duncan Stewart, geologist, Carleton College, Minnesota, whose writing and interpretation of Antarctic rock samples have contributed to knowledge of the continent.

Nunataks of Ellsworth Land